Venezuela does not recognize same-sex unions. In 2008, the Supreme Tribunal of Justice ruled that the Constitution of Venezuela neither prohibits nor requires the recognition of same-sex marriage. In January 2015, a lawsuit seeking to legalise same-sex marriage in Venezuela was filed with the Supreme Tribunal, which announced in April 2016 that it would hear the case, though no decision has been made as of March 2023. On 24 February 2022, a deputy of the opposition Cambiemos Movimiento Ciudadano party introduced a same-sex marriage bill to the National Assembly.

Legal history

Constitutional wording and 2008 Supreme Tribunal ruling
Article 77 of the Constitution of Venezuela, adopted in 1999, states that "marriage between a man and a woman is protected". It was unclear if the wording explicitly outlawed same-sex marriage. In February 2008, the Supreme Tribunal of Justice ruled in favor of Unión Afirmativa (Affirmative Union), a group advocating for same-sex marriage, who had requested clarification on the wording. The group had argued that the sentence was unclear and did not prevent same-sex couples from enjoying some economic and social rights, including property rights in case of separation or death, alimony, adoption rights, social security benefits, protection from domestic violence, the possibility to acquire the nationality of a partner, and others. The court ruled that the National Assembly "could", but was not bound to, legislate in order to protect such rights for same-sex partners. The court ruled that Article 77 does not prohibit same-sex de facto unions or marriage, but also does not require their recognition.

Article 77 of the Constitution reads as follows:

 in Spanish: 
 Marriage between a man a woman, which is based on free consent and absolute equality of rights and obligations of the spouses, is protected. A stable de facto union between a man and a woman which meets the requirements established by law shall have the same effects as marriage.

Legal challenges

In January 2015, a lawsuit for the right to marry was filed with the Supreme Tribunal of Justice. On 28 April 2016, the court announced it would hear the case. The lawsuit challenges article 44 of the Civil Code, which states that marriage is only legally valid between a man and a woman. No ruling has been issued as of February 2023. Activists protested in front of the Supreme Tribunal building in Caracas in January 2022, criticising the seven years of inaction by the court.

On 15 August 2016, a Venezuelan citizen and his American husband, Carlos J. Holder Wendell and Patrick A. Holder Wendell, filed a lawsuit in the U.S. District Court of Massachusetts against the Venezuelan Government for its failure to recognize their legal marriage after multiple requests and petitions to the Venezuelan consulate in Boston. Their lawsuit alleged that the Venezuelan Government's refusal to recognize their marriage violated the Venezuelan Constitution, the Civil Code and the Vienna Convention on Consular Relations, a treaty to which both the United States and Venezuela are parties. Judge Indira Talwani dismissed the case in May 2017, holding that U.S. courts lack standing to rule on the policies and law of foreign states.

2018 Inter-American Court of Human Rights ruling
On 9 January 2018, in advisory opinion OC 24/7, the Inter-American Court of Human Rights (IACHR) ruled that countries signatory to the American Convention on Human Rights are required to allow same-sex couples to marry. The ruling states that:

Venezuela ratified the American Convention on Human Rights on 9 August 1977 and recognized the court's jurisdiction on 24 June 1981. Venezuela under President Hugo Chávez withdrew from the convention in 2013. In May 2019, the National Assembly controlled by the Venezuelan opposition and recognizing Juan Guaidó as president nullified the withdrawal.

Legislative action

Civil unions
On 20 March 2009, Deputy Romelia Matute from the ruling United Socialist Party of Venezuela introduced an amendment to a bill on gender equality to legalize same-sex asociaciones de convivencia (association by cohabitation). However, later that same month, Marelys Pérez, chairperson of the Family, Women and Youth Commission, denied that such language was being considered as part of the gender equality bill; adding that although the Commission would debate the same-sex partnership initiative, it would be excluded from the current bill and likely wait for its inclusion into a future civil code reform or a future updated anti-discrimination measure. The changes to the law were postponed multiple times.

In June 2016, the Democratic Unity Roundtable announced that it would work on a civil union bill granting same-sex couples many of the rights and benefits granted to opposite-sex spouses. The draft stalled and did not receive a reading in the National Assembly.

Same-sex marriage
The proposal was accompanied with 21,000 signatures and supported by the state governments of Barinas, Falcón, Mérida, Monagas, Táchira, Yaracuy and Zulia. The measure sought to modify article 44 of the Civil Code to legalize same-sex marriages in Venezuela. Elvis Amoroso, president of the Internal Policy Commission, said that any discussion on the bill was unlikely to occur in 2014. The proposal was opposed by religious groups, including the Episcopal Conference of Venezuela, which said that "God created marriage as between a man and a woman", while also stating that churches "should defend and promote the dignity of every human being". Spokespeople for the ACVI responded that Venezuela is a secular state and that the measure would not compel religious denominations to perform same-sex marriages. As with the civil union bills, the legislation stalled and was not voted on by the Assembly.

In November 2017, President Nicolás Maduro said that "I think everyone should be able to get married, even if they're homosexual", saying that the Constituent Assembly would agree to discuss the legalization of same-sex marriage. In September 2018, Hermann Escarrá, a member of the Constituent Assembly, said that there were active discussions to include provisions recognizing same-sex marriage in a new constitution being drafted, and suggested that the move had majority support in the Assembly. Discussions on a new constitution were expected to begin at the end of 2018 or early 2019, though this was postponed due to the presidential crisis.

On 24 February 2022, Vanessa Robertazzo, deputy of the opposition Cambiemos Movimiento Ciudadano party, introduced a same-sex marriage bill to the National Assembly.

Marriages in Simón Rodríguez
In February 2022, Mayor Ernesto Paraquima of the Simón Rodríguez Municipality, Anzoátegui, announced that the municipality would perform same-sex marriages. Article 4 of a municipal decree issued by Paraquima "order[s] the celebration and registration of marriages without discrimination based on race, sex, creed, social status, nationality, sexual orientation, gender identity, and gender expression." The marriages are understood as having no legal effect, as the definition of marriage is a federal matter under Venezuelan law. Paraquima said the marriages are private contracts granting same-sex couples some legal rights and responsibilities. "If the State does not want to become involved due to registration and notarization, then we will endorse it and do it as a private document. That would also work and we would be the first," said Paraquima. The marriages have no legal standing, and are entirely symbolic. The cost to register is $400, which was criticised by activists as unaffordable for couples in light of the hyperinflation in Venezuela. The first three marriage contracts for same-sex couples were issued on 8 March 2022.

Two-spirit marriages
The tida wena also participated in the harvest of important crops. Historically, they were sometimes the second or third wives of polygamous men. They also occasionally performed the role of a shaman. Though traditionally integrated and respected within their communities, encroaching social norms have caused the tida wena to experience discrimination today, "threatening the relative well-being that tida wena have enjoyed for centuries".

Public opinion
According to a Pew Research Center survey conducted between November 8, 2013 and February 12, 2014, 28% of Venezuelans supported same-sex marriage, while 61% were opposed.

According to the 2014 AmericasBarometer published in June 2015, 29.6% of Venezuelans were in favour of same-sex marriage. The 2017 AmericasBarometer showed that 39% of Venezuelans supported same-sex marriage.

A 2023 poll by the Equilibrium – Center for Economic Development (Equilibrium CenDE) found that 55% of Venezuelans supported same-sex marriage (41% "totally" and 14% "somewhat"), while 32% opposed it (25% "totally" and 7% "somewhat"). 48% of respondents also supported adoption by same-sex couples (34% "totally" and 14% "somewhat"), while 39% were opposed (28% "totally" and 11% "somewhat").

See also
LGBT rights in Venezuela
Recognition of same-sex unions in the Americas

Notes

References

LGBT rights in Venezuela
Venezuela